Bryan Manor is a historic archaeological site located near Williamsburg, York County, Virginia. It is the site of a plantation established by Frederick Bryan after purchasing a 500-acre plot in 1757. A map by the French cartographer Desandrouin in 1781–1782 indicated a complex of five buildings. A survey in 1976 identified an unusual footing of bog iron bonded with shell mortar. Also on the site is the stone slab over the grave of John Bryan, one-year-old son of Frederick Bryan, who died in 1760.

It was added to the National Register of Historic Places in 1978.

References

Plantations in Virginia
Archaeological sites on the National Register of Historic Places in Virginia
National Register of Historic Places in York County, Virginia
1757 establishments in the Thirteen Colonies